Pseudopaludicola llanera (common name: Lynch's swamp frog) is a species of frog in the family Leptodactylidae. It is found in the Llanos in the Amazon and Orinoco basins in northeastern Colombia and northern Venezuela. The specific name llanera is Spanish word for a female inhabitant of the Llanos.

Description
Males measure  and females  in snout–vent length. The dorsal colour is brown with some slightly darker markings; the skin bears flattened warts of various sizes. The upper arm is dull orange. The groin and concealed surfaces of the thighs are stippled with straw yellow. The flanks have dark olive lower edges. The throat (flecked with grey) and venter are white.

Habitat and conservation
Pseudopaludicola llanera occur in a range of habitats: savannas, grasslands, degraded tropical dry forests, and gallery forests. During the dry season they can occur in dry leaf-litter along the beds of temporary streams. Eggs are laid in temporary or permanent ponds or in temporary streams.

This species can be locally impacted by expanding rice fields and the chemical pollution associated with them.

References

llanera
Amphibians of Colombia
Amphibians of Venezuela
Taxonomy articles created by Polbot
Amphibians described in 1989